The Ain Diwar Bridge, also known as the Zangid Bridge, is a ruined masonry arch bridge, 3.5 km northeast of the town of Ain Diwar, Syria. The bridge is within vicinity of the Syria, Iraq and Turkey border region and about 500 m west of the Tigris River which it previously crossed.

The Ain Diwar bridge was built in the 2nd century by the Romans to give them access to Upper Mesopotamia. The Romans also previously set up the Bezabde Camp (modern day Cizre, Turkey) nearby. It was refurbished by the Seljuks and Arabs in the late 12th or early 13th century. The Ain Diwar Bridge is often referred to as a great example of Islamic architecture and civil engineering. Stone carvings on the bridge depict astrological figures, zodiac signs and cavalrymen, which are attributed to Roman architecture.

However, the structure is listed neither by O'Connor nor Galliazzo in their comprehensive surveys of Roman bridges.

See also 
 List of Roman bridges
 Roman architecture
 Roman engineering

References 

Roman bridges in Syria
Stone bridges in Syria
Crusade places
Buildings and structures in al-Hasakah Governorate
Archaeological sites in al-Hasakah Governorate
Bridges over the Tigris River
Stone bridges
Arch bridges
Zengid architecture